John Berney  was Archdeacon of Norwich  from 11 October 1744 until  his death on 13 June 1782.

He held livings at Hethersett, St Mary, Saxlingham and St Clement, Norwich.

References

1782 deaths
18th-century English Anglican priests
Archdeacons of Norwich